Federico Lungwitz (born 8 May 1960) is an Argentine rower. He competed in the men's quadruple sculls event at the 1984 Summer Olympics.

References

1960 births
Living people
Argentine male rowers
Olympic rowers of Argentina
Rowers at the 1984 Summer Olympics
Place of birth missing (living people)
Pan American Games medalists in rowing
Pan American Games bronze medalists for Argentina
Rowers at the 1983 Pan American Games